Yuriy Vankevych (26 January 1946) is a former professional Soviet football defender and coach.

References

External links
 
 Sharafudinov, V. Donetsk team of Kievans (Сборная донецких киевлян). Futbolnyi Klub. 14 April 2014

1946 births
Living people
Footballers from Kyiv
Soviet footballers
FC Dynamo Kyiv players
FC Dynamo-2 Kyiv players
FC Metalist Kharkiv players
FC Polissya Zhytomyr players
FC Shakhtar Donetsk players
Soviet Top League players
Soviet football managers
Ukrainian football managers
FC Shakhtar Horlivka managers
FC Shakhtar Shakhtarsk managers
FC Khimik Severodonetsk managers
FC Molniya Severodonetsk managers
Association football defenders